
Gmina Platerów is a rural gmina (administrative district) in Łosice County, Masovian Voivodeship, in east-central Poland.

The gmina contains part of the protected area called Podlasie Bug Gorge Landscape Park.

Villages
Gmina Platerów contains the villages and settlements of Chłopków, Chłopków-Kolonia, Czuchów, Czuchów-Pieńki, Falatycze, Górki, Hruszew, Hruszniew, Hruszniew-Kolonia, Kamianka, Kisielew, Lipno, Mężenin, Mężenin-Kolonia, Michałów, Myszkowice, Nowodomki, Ostromęczyn, Ostromęczyn-Kolonia, Platerów, Puczyce, Rusków and Zaborze.

Neighbouring gminas
Gmina Platerów is bordered by the gminas of Drohiczyn, Korczew, Łosice, Przesmyki, Sarnaki, Siemiatycze and Stara Kornica.

References

Polish official population figures 2006

Platerow
Łosice County